This is a list of electoral division results for the Northern Territory 2016 general election.

Overall results

|}

Independents: Robyn Lambley (Araluen), Terry Mills (Blain), Kezia Purick (Goyder), Gerry Wood (Nelson), Yingiya Mark Guyula (Nhulunbuy)

Results by electoral division

Arafura

Araluen

Arnhem

Barkly

Blain

Braitling

Brennan

Casuarina

Daly

Drysdale

Fannie Bay

Fong Lim

Goyder

Johnston

Karama

Katherine

Namatjira

Nelson

Nhulunbuy

Nightcliff

Port Darwin

Sanderson

Spillett

Stuart

Wanguri

References 

Elections in the Northern Territory
Results of Northern Territory elections